The Orapa diamond mine is the world's largest diamond mine by area. Orapa ("resting place for lions") is owned by Debswana, a partnership between the De Beers company and the government of Botswana. The mine was discovered on 1 March 1967, a year after Botswana's independence, by a team of De Beers geologists, including Manfred Marx, Jim Gibson and led by Dr. Gavin Lamont. It is the oldest of four mines operated by the company, and began operations in July 1971 and its first production was 1,438,168 carats. The revenue the mine generated is credited for transforming the Botswana economy, as it allowed the government to invest in critical social services and national infrastructure.

Orapa is an open pit style of mine and is the largest diamond mine in the world by area. The mine is located on two kimberlite pipes that converge near the surface, covering . Orapa operates seven days per week, and produces  of ore and an additional  of waste rock per year. The mine was expanded in 1999, doubling its previous capacity. The processing plant at Orapa processes the ore produced at Orapa as well as two of Debswana's three other mines, the Letlhakane and Damtshaa diamond mines.

Orapa and its sister mine Letlhakane employ over 3,100. Debswana also maintains a 100-bed hospital, pre-primary and primary schools for employees' children, and the Orapa game park. The mine maintains an ISO 14001 certificate for environmental compliance, and places some importance on water conservation and waste management.

The preserved Cretaceous (Turonian ~94-90 million years old) lake sediments overlying the pipe are an important locality for fossil insects.

References

References

 Debswana diamond mines (Retrieved April 13, 2005)
 Orapa (Retrieved April 29, 2008)

External links

 https://en.israelidiamond.co.il/wikidiamond/diamond-mining-mines/orapa-diamond-mine/

Diamond mines in Botswana
Diatremes of Botswana
Open-pit mines
Pre-Holocene volcanoes
Surface mines in Botswana